Miss Colombia 2000, the 66th Miss Colombia pageant, was held in Cartagena de Indias, Colombia, on November 12, 2000, after three weeks of events.  The winner of the pageant was Andrea Nocetti, Miss Cartagena.

The pageant was broadcast live on RCN TV from the Centro de Convenciones Julio Cesar Turbay in Cartagena de Indias, Colombia. At the conclusion of the final night of competition, outgoing titleholder Catalina Acosta crowned Andrea Nocetti of Cartagena de Indias as the new Miss Colombia.

Results

Special awards

Delegates 
The Miss Colombia 2000 delegates are:

Amazonas - Claudia Alejandra Palacios López
 Antioquia - Ana Milena Amórtegui González
 Atlántico - Natalie Elvira Ackermann Montealegre
 Bogotá D.C. -  María Fernanda Navia Cardona
 Bolívar -  Maria Rocío Stevenson Covo
 Caldas - Andrea Ocampo González
 Cartagena DT y C - Andrea María Noceti Gómez
 Cauca - Mónica Caicedo Valencia
 Cundinamarca - Marcela Ocampo Trujillo
 Guajira - Luz Karime Henríquez Gómez
 Huila - María del Pilar Sandoval Medina
 Magdalena - Lizeth Alfaro López
 Meta - Martha Alexandra Gaitán Lozano
 Nariño - Carolina Rivera Bedoya
 Norte de Santander - Ana Alexandra Rolón Lara
 Putumayo - Paola Andrea Muñoz López
 Risaralda - Natalia Londoño Builes
 San Andrés and Providencia -  Margaret Brown Bryan
 Santander - Luzdey Edith Ibarra Rangel
 Sucre -  Silvia Paola Flórez Sierra
 Tolima - Diana Carolina Rengifo Ortiz
 Valle - Giselle Garcés Aljure

References and footnotes

External links
Official site

Miss Colombia
2000 in Colombia
2000 beauty pageants